Jarvis Brook is a village between Crowborough and Rotherfield in the Borough of Wealden East Sussex. Crowborough Railway Station, on the Uckfield branch of the Oxted Line, is in the village.

See also
 Rehoboth Chapel, Jarvis Brook

References

Villages in East Sussex
Crowborough